Artur Nielsen (13 June 1895 – 15 September 1988) was a Danish long-distance runner. He competed in the men's 5000 metres and cross country events at the 1920 Summer Olympics.

References

1895 births
1988 deaths
Athletes (track and field) at the 1920 Summer Olympics
Danish male long-distance runners
Olympic athletes of Denmark
Place of birth missing
Olympic cross country runners